A Morning Raga/An Evening Raga is a 1968 LP by Hindustani classical musician Ravi Shankar. It was originally released under the alternative title Raga Nata Bhairav · Raga Mishra Piloo in the U.K., but had the simplified title for its original U.S. and Canadian releases, as well as most subsequent re-releases. It was also released as Ravi Shankar in India in 1970. A digitally remastered version was released in CD format through Angel Records. 

The record features two North Indian ragas; Nata Bhairav, which is a morning raga created by Shankar in the mid-1960s by combining aspects of the ragas Nat and Bhairav, and Mishra Piloo, which is a popular evening raga. The original liner notes feature detailed descriptions of each raga's melodic and structural content.

Track listing
"Raga Nata Bhairav" – 23:18
"Raga Mishra Piloo" – 24:32

Personnel
 Ravi Shankar – sitar
 Alla Rakha – tabla
 Kamala Chakravarti – tanpura
 Prodyot Sen – bass tanpura

External links
Release page on Discogs.com

1968 EPs
Ravi Shankar albums
Angel Records EPs